Imanguliyev, feminine Imanguliyeva, is an Azerbaijani surname. Notable people with the surname include:

 Aida Imanguliyeva (1939–1992), Azerbaijani scholar
 Nasir Imanguliyev (1911–1998), Azerbaijani scientist

See also
 Imangulu

Azerbaijani-language surnames